Bhakta Kavi Narsinh Mehta University is a state university located at Junagadh, Gujarat, India. It was established in 2015 by Bhakta Kavi Narsinh Mehta University Act, 2015 of the Government of Gujarat.

References

External links

Universities in Gujarat
Junagadh
Educational institutions established in 2015
2015 establishments in Gujarat